Giuseppe "Pino" Donaggio (born 24 November 1941) is an Italian musician, singer, and composer of film and television scores. A classically-trained violinist, Donaggio is known for his collaborations with director Brian De Palma, and for his work in both European and American genre cinema. He has won two Italian Golden Globe Awards, and has been nominated for two David di Donatello, four Golden Ciak, two Nastro d'Argento, and a Saturn Award.

Life and career

Born in Burano (an island of Venice), into a family of musicians, Donaggio began studying violin at the age of ten, first at the Benedetto Marcello conservatory in Venice, followed by the Giuseppe Verdi Conservatory in Milan. At the age of 14, he made his solo debut in a Vivaldi concert for Italian radio, then went on to play for both the I Solisti Veneti and the Solisti di Milano. The discovery of rock and roll during the summer of 1959 ended Donaggio's classical career when he made his singing debut with Paul Anka. He then began to write his own songs and established himself as one of Italy's prominent singer-songwriters. He took part in the Sanremo Festival with "Come sinfonia" (1961) and had a string of successes including "Una casa in cima al mondo".

However, his greatest hit was the 1965 hit "Io che non-vivo", which sold 80 million records worldwide and was performed most popularly in English as "You Don't Have to Say You Love Me" by Dusty Springfield and Elvis Presley.

His first film was the British/Italian horror film Don't Look Now. Since then he has composed music for several films, including Dario Argento's Two Evil Eyes, Trauma and Do You Like Hitchcock?. He also composed the scores for several horror films including Piranha, Tourist Trap, The Howling, The Black Cat and Seed of Chucky. He works regularly with US director Brian De Palma, scoring De Palma's Carrie, Home Movies, Dressed to Kill, Blow Out, Body Double, Raising Cain  and Passion.

In 2012 he was awarded the Lifetime Achievement Award from the World Soundtrack Academy.

Filmography

Film

1970s

1980s

1990s

2000s

2010s

2020s

Television 

Strada senza uscita (1986)
The Fifth Missile (1986)
Tabloid Crime (1987)
Ocean (1989)
Non aprite all'uomo nero (1990)
I misteri della giungla nera (1991)
Pray for Ricki Forster (1991)
La stella del parco (1991)
Scoop (1992)
Colpo di coda (1993)
Missione d'amore (1993)
Cliffs of the Death (1993)
L'ispettore Sarti – Un poliziotto, una città (1993–94) 
Ho un segreto con papà (1994)
Inka Connection (1995)
Californian Quartet (1995)
Die Straßen von Berlin (1995–96) 
 (1996)
New York Crossing (1996)
Die Stunden vor dem Morgengrauen (1997)
Racket (1997) 
Inquietudine (1997)
Rescuers: Stories of Courage (1998)
Il tesoro di Damasco (1998)
Le ragazze di Piazza di Spagna (1998–99)
Avvocati (1998–99)
Only A Dead Man Is A Good Man (1999)
Angels' Sin (1999)
Commesse (1999–2002)
Don Matteo (2000–14) 
Sospetti (2000–04) 
Lo zio d'America (2002–06)
Un caso di coscienza (2003–06)
Provaci ancora prof (2005–07)
La moglie cinese (2006)
Il segreto di Arianna (2007)
Fuga con Marlene (2007)
La vita rubata (2008)
Fidati di me (2008–09)
Ho sposato uno sbirro (2008–10)
L'uomo che cavalcava nel buio (2009)
Sisi (2009)
La donna che ritorna (2011)
Dove la trovi una come me? (2011)
Rossella (2011–12)
Un passo dal cielo (2011–12)
Cesare Mori – Il prefetto di ferro (2012)
Madre, aiutami (2013–14)
La strada dritta (2014)
Il sistema (2016)

References

External links
 
 
 Pino Donaggio in Epdlp (Spanish)

1941 births
Italian film score composers
Italian songwriters
La-La Land Records artists
Living people
Italian male film score composers
Male songwriters
Musicians from Venice
Varèse Sarabande Records artists